"Hero" is a song by Canadian musician Chad Kroeger (lead vocalist of Nickelback) and American musician Josey Scott (then lead vocalist of Saliva) for the soundtrack to the 2002 superhero film Spider-Man. It was written by Kroeger and recorded specifically for the film. "Hero" was released through Roadrunner Records on March 1, 2002, as the soundtrack's lead single. The song serves as Kroeger's debut solo release.

There are two widely-available versions of the song: one with an orchestral background and one without. Mike Kroeger (bassist of Nickelback), Tyler Connolly (lead singer/guitarist of Theory of a Deadman), and Matt Cameron (drummer of Soundgarden and Pearl Jam) appear on the recording. In addition to its digital release, "Hero" was distributed internationally in various CD single and maxi single formats. Theory of a Deadman's "Invisible Man" was included on many of these releases.

"Hero" experienced worldwide commercial success, peaking in the top 10 of record charts in Austria, Canada, Denmark, Germany, Ireland, New Zealand, Sweden, Switzerland, the United Kingdom, and the United States. The song also topped the US Billboard Mainstream Rock and Modern Rock airplay charts. It was nominated for Best Song Written for a Motion Picture, Television or Other Visual Media, Best Rock Performance by a Duo or Group with Vocal, and Best Rock Song at the 45th Grammy Awards (2003).

Background

The song was the result of a collaboration between Kroeger and Scott. Scott told Yahoo!'s entertainment news service LAUNCH, "(Kroeger) had the idea for the song 'Hero,' so I came up to Vancouver and met him. He pitched me the idea, and I thought that was pretty dope. Real dope. So we sort of tweaked it, together, laid down some harmonies on it, and played everything from congas to acoustics on it."

Matt Cameron, who played drums on the recording, did not appear in the music video and cited "family issues" as the reason. Our Lady Peace drummer Jeremy Taggart appeared in his place, performing along to Cameron's drum track.

Alice in Chains guitarist Jerry Cantrell was originally picked to play the guitar solo (later played by Tyler Connolly), but he pulled out. He did, however, contribute to the soundtrack with the song "She Was My Girl", from his solo album Degradation Trip.

Music video
The music video consists of the group, except for Matt Cameron, performing on a building's rooftop purportedly in New York City, with footage of the movie spliced in between, and was directed by Nigel Dick. It was filmed in Vancouver, British Columbia on March 24, 2002, and premiered on March 28.

The song has won Best Video from a Film at the 2002 MTV Video Music Awards.

Critical reception
Reviewing the song for NME, Imran Ahmed was critical of Kroeger's "predictability" and drew a strong comparison to "How You Remind Me", Nickelback's 2001 international breakthrough, calling the formula for both "Commercial grunge + MOR sensibility = Nu-MOR hit."

Chart performance
The song was a cross-genre hit in mid-2002, peaking at number one on the Billboard Modern Rock and Mainstream Rock charts, number three on the Billboard Hot 100, and also winning considerable airplay at pop radio, peaking at number two and five, respectively, on the Mainstream Top 40 and Adult Top 40 charts.

Track listings

Personnel
 Chad Kroeger of Nickelback – rhythm guitar, vocals
 Josey Scott of Saliva – acoustic guitar, vocals
 Tyler Connolly of Theory of a Deadman – lead guitar
 Mike Kroeger of Nickelback – bass guitar
 Matt Cameron of Pearl Jam and Soundgarden – drums
 Brian Larson of VSO – violin, string quartet leader

Charts and certifications

Weekly charts

Year-end charts

Certifications

Release history

References

External links
 Full lyrics of the song at Google Play Music

2002 singles
2002 songs
Canadian Singles Chart number-one singles
Chad Kroeger songs
Josey Scott songs
Roadrunner Records singles
Songs from Spider-Man films
Songs written by Chad Kroeger
Songs written by Tyler Connolly
Spider-Man (2002 film series)